Bangkalan Regency is a regency of East Java province in Indonesia. The seat of its government is Bangkalan. The regency is located on the west side of Madura Island, bordering with Sampang Regency to the east, Java Sea to the north and Madura Strait to the west and the south sides. It covers an area of 1,260.14 km2, and had a population of 906,761 at the 2010 census (an increase from 805,048 at the previous census in 2000) and reached 1,060,377 at the 2020 census.	

In 2009, the Suramadu Bridge was completed, being the first (toll) bridge ever to connect Java and Madura islands. The Suramadu Bridge is the longest bridge in Indonesia. Previously, Kamal port was the main gateway between Madura island and Java, where ferries serve the port with the Ujung port nearby Surabaya, but nowadays people prefer to travel across the toll bridge than using ferries, so now only a few ferries serve it in day time only.

Bangkalan Regency is included in the Gerbangkertosusila development regions, an extended region of Surabaya industrial areas.

Administrative Districts 
Bangkalan Regency consists of eighteen districts, tabulated below with their areas and their populations at the 2010 census and the 2020 census. The table also includes the location of the district administrative centres, the number of administrative villages (rural desa and urban kelurahan) in each district, and its postcode.

See also 

 List of regencies and cities of Indonesia

References

Madura Island
Regencies of East Java